The 1999 season of the Bhutanese A-Division was the fifth recorded season of top-flight football in Bhutan. The league was won by Druk Pol, their fourth title in a row and the first time a Bhutanese team had won four titles consecutively.

References

Bhutan A-Division seasons
Bhutan
Bhutan
football